Maria Cecilia Beronilla Bisa van Ommen, also known as Acel Bisa (her maiden name), is a singer and songwriter from the Philippines.

Career 
She is most popular for performing the song Torete with her former band Moonstar88. But as a solo artist, she has also become famous for singing the English version of One Love, the theme song to the hit Korean television drama Spring Waltz.

In 2007 Acel released her first album as a solo artist entitled Silver Lining. A ten-track album featuring songs Laugh and Cry, Pakiusap, Sa Ngalan Ng Pag-Ibig, and Silver Lining among others.

Acel has also contributed her original compositions to soundtracks of Philippine prime-time television shows My Girl (for her song Gulo, Hilo, Lito) and Rounin (for her song Sa Ngalan Ng Pag-Ibig). She contributed the song "I Believe" to the album Captured of the singer Christian Bautista. She has also worked with the band Gish while in 2011, she co-wrote the song “Palawan” with Yeng Constantino. She collaborated with the group Sesa and the artist Emmanuelle Vera. Acel released the EP Hello to Heaven, which included the single "Liliwanag".

Former Bands 
From 1999 to 2004, Acel was the front-woman for the popular band Moonstar88. During her five years with theband she released two studio albums (Popcorn in 2001 and Press to Play in 2002) producing highly acclaimed songs Torete, Sulat, Sa Langit, and Fall On Me. Before her departure from the band in 2004 Acel worked with Maychelle Baay for several weeks to transition her into replacing her for the spot of lead vocalist.

Before her time with Moonstar88, Acel was part of the band Orphan Lily from 1995 to 1998. Together with Terence Tevez, Jeff Lima, and Paolo Bernaldo, they released a self-titled album with their hit single No Reason and was awarded NU107's Best New Artist award at the 1998 NU107 Rock Awards.

Discography 
 2022 - Buhangin 
 2021 - Nais Lumaya (featuring Carlisle Tabanera)
 2021 - Bawat Paghinga (featuring Gil Andrie)
 2019 - Your Universe (theme from Between Maybes)
 2015 - "Who Would Have Thought? Finding Identity, Love, and Purpose in Unexpected Moments" (first published book of Acel with 8 original songs downloadable in the book)
 2012 - "Hello To Heaven" 6 track original compositions light CD
 2008 - Silver Lining by Acel van Ommen (her debut album as a solo-artist)
 2008 - My Girl (for her song Gulo, Hilo, Lito with various artists including Sam Milby, Richard Poon and Yeng Constantino)
 2008 - Spring Waltz (for her song One Love - English Version)
 2007 - Rounin OST (with various artists including Bamboo and Kitchie Nadal)
 2002 - Press to Play by Moonstar88
 2001 - Popcorn by Moonstar88
 1998 - Orphan Lily (self-titled album of her former band Orphan Lily)

Family 
Acel was born on August 28, 1976, as Maria Cecilia B. Bisa to university professors Simplicio and Paulina Bisa.

Personal life
In 2004 she married her friend Danny van Ommen. After four years of marriage, she gave birth to her son Nikolai Tashi in July 2008.

Awards and nominations

References

External links
 Acel's official website

1976 births
Living people
Filipino rock singers
Filipino singer-songwriters
21st-century Filipino singers
21st-century Filipino women singers
Star Music artists